Sindou Dosso (born April 23, 1986 in Côte d'Ivoire) is an Ivorian football player.

External links
 
ORGANIZATION OF PROFESSIONAL FOOTBALLERS at HLSZ 

1986 births
Living people
Ivorian footballers
Stella Club d'Adjamé players
Ivorian expatriate footballers
Expatriate footballers in Hungary
Nyíregyháza Spartacus FC players
Ivorian expatriate sportspeople in Hungary
Vecsés FC footballers
Kecskeméti TE players
Expatriate footballers in Israel
Hapoel Rishon LeZion F.C. players
Ivorian expatriate sportspeople in Israel
Israeli Premier League players
Nemzeti Bajnokság I players
Association football forwards